Yashoda - Goshta Shyamchya Aaichi is an Indian Marathi language historical television series which is airing on Zee Marathi. It starred Varada Deodhar and Rohini Hattangadi in lead roles. It premiered from 13 February 2023 along with Lavangi Mirchi in afternoon slot under the segment Aapli Dupar, Zee Marathi Dupar. It is produced by Viren Pradhan and directed by Ganesh Rasane under the banner of Piccolo Films.

Plot 
The interesting story of Yashoda, Sane Guruji's mother, a deeply traditional yet independent woman, who brought him up to be a man of unshakeable principles.

Special episode (1 hour) 
 5 March 2023

Cast 
 Varada Deodhar as Yashoda Parchure (Bayo)
 Rohini Hattangadi as Rukmini Parchure
 Nayana Apte Joshi as Kaveri Sane
 Abhijeet Chavan as Pralhad Keshav Atre
 Mrunmayee Gondhalekar as Radha Parchure
 Taraka Pednekar as Godavari Sane
 Rutuja Chipade as Narmada Parchure
 Rugvedi Pradhan as Sulochana Sane
 Arun Pandarkar as Prabhakar
 Shruti Puranik
 Gururaj Avadhani
 Srushti Pagare
 Anil Gawas
 Ashok Samel
 Dinesh Kanade
 Ovi Karmarkar
 Vishakh Mhamankar

References

External links 
 Yashoda - Goshta Shyamchya Aaichi at ZEE5
 
Marathi-language television shows
2023 Indian television series debuts
Zee Marathi original programming